St. Lawrence University is a private liberal arts college in Canton, New York, United States.

St. Lawrence University may also refer to:

 St. Lawrence University (Uganda), Kampala, Uganda
 St. Lawrence Saints, the athletic teams representing St. Lawrence University

See also 
 St. Lawrence University–Old Campus Historic District, a historic district centred on St. Lawrence University